Zarand may refer to: 
 Zarand, Iran, a city in Kerman Province, Iran
 Zarand, Qazvin, a village in Qazvin Province, Iran
 Zarand, Zanjan, a village in Zanjan Province, Iran
 Zarand County, an administrative subdivision of Kerman Province, Iran
 Zărand, Arad County, Romania